The  Little League World Series was held in South Williamsport, Pennsylvania. It began on August 20 and ended on August 29. Eight teams from the United States and eight from throughout the world competed in the 64th edition of this tournament. In the championship game, the international champions from Tokyo, Japan, defeated the United States champions out of Waipahu, Hawaii. It was the seventh LLWS championship for Japan overall, and the first since 2003.

Activision released a video game in advance of the event, Little League World Series Baseball 2010.

Tournament changes

On April 14, 2010, Little League announced that starting in 2010, round robin play would be replaced by a double-elimination bracket in each pool. The winners of each pool will advance to single elimination US and International Championship games and the winners of those games will advance to the World Championship game. Every team will play a minimum of three games: the four teams that lose their first two games will cross over and play special US vs. International games.

On August 2, 2010, it was announced that instant replay would be expanded. The system, which was first used in 2008, now includes force outs, tags along the base paths, missed bases, and hit batters as plays that are subject to review. Previously, only plays in which a dead ball would have resulted were able to be reviewed. Additionally, team managers are now allowed to challenge plays if the umpires have not already called for a replay. Before losing the right to challenge, managers are allowed only one unsuccessful challenge in the first six innings of a game, as well as one unsuccessful challenge in extra innings. Challenges must be made after the play in question and before the next pitch. A "replay team" located in an office at Howard J. Lamade Stadium will judge all plays under review. The first challenge in LLWS history that resulted in an original ruling being overturned occurred on August 21, the second day of the tournament. Prior to the championship game, instant replay had been used 16 times with 8 calls being overturned while the other 8 were upheld. The average amount of time needed for all reviews was 52 seconds.

Teams

Republic of China, commonly known as Taiwan, due to complicated relations with People's Republic of China, is recognized by the name Chinese Taipei by majority of international organizations including Little League Baseball (LLB). For more information, please see Cross-Strait relations.

Results

United States

Pool A

Pool B

International

Pool C

Pool D

Championship games

Champions path
The Edogawa Minami LL reached the LLWS with a record of 8 wins, 1 loss, and 1 tie. In total, their record was 13–1–1, their only loss coming against Musashi-Fuchu.

References

External links
2010 official results via Wayback Machine

 
Little League World Series
Little League World Series
Little League World Series